Peter Collett may refer to:

 Peter Collett (judge) (1766–1836), Norwegian judge
 Peter Collett (writer) (1767–1823), Danish judge and writer